The 2011–12 version of the Jordan FA Cup was the 32nd edition to be played. It is the premier knockout tournament for football teams in Jordan. The tournament was adjusted to be played over one leg rather than two in previous editions.

Al-Faisaly (Amman) went into this edition as the club with the most wins, on 16.

Al Wahdat are the current title holders, having won the competition for the last three seasons.

The cup winner was guaranteed a place in the 2013 AFC Cup.

Round of 16

|colspan="3" style="background-color:#99CCCC"|15 October 2011

|-
|colspan="3" style="background-color:#99CCCC"|16 October 2011

|-
|colspan="3" style="background-color:#99CCCC"|17 October 2011

|-
|colspan="3" style="background-color:#99CCCC"|30 November 2011

|}

Quarter-finals

8 teams play home and away matches as Knock out stage. 

|}

Semi-finals

4 teams play home and away matches as Knock out stage. 

|}

Final

|}

External links
Soccerway.com

Jordan FA Cup seasons
Jordan
Cup